ShoreZone is a mapping program that acquires oblique aerial images at low altitude during the lowest daylight tides of the year to inventory alongshore and across-shore geomorphological and biological features of the Pacific Northwest intertidal shoreline. Habitat attributes are interpreted from the aerial images and categorized in a geographic database. The mapping program was first developed as an oil spill response tool for British Columbia, and now ShoreZone extends from Oregon to Alaska. Other uses of the spatial data include ecological studies, marine conservation planning, shoreline erosion monitoring, coastal flooding and vulnerability assessments, developing climate change adaptation strategies, and community education.

Development
A ShoreZone imaging and mapping prototype was originally developed by Dr. Ed Owens and demonstrated on Saltspring Island, British Columbia in 1979. A decade of further development resulted in the first protocols for the Physical Shore-zone Mapping System published by the British Columbia Ministry of Environment and Climate Change Strategy. A compatible biological classification was developed in the early 1990s and the fully integrated biophysical mapping system was first applied to Gwaii Haanas National Park and the remainder of British Columbia  imaged and mapped from 1991 to 2007. The State of Washington was imaged and mapped between 1994-2000, and the coast of Oregon was imaged in 2011 and mapped in 2013. The Alaska program began in 2001 when the Cook Inlet Regional Citizens Advisory Council contracted Coastal and Ocean Resources Inc. to image and map Cook Inlet, and as of 2022 the Alaska program is on-going (see map). The spatially contiguous database of imagery and habitat attributes now includes over 100,000 km of shoreline. In 2014, Dr. Carl Schoch of Coastwise Science pioneered the use of Structure From Motion using Microsoft Photosynth to orthorectify ShoreZone oblique aerial imagery and to generate a point cloud of photographed objects used to produce a three-dimensional model of the shoreline. The concept was derived from the Argus Coastal Monitoring Systems that observe and quantitatively document the coastal environment. These systems typically employ a group of fixed digital video cameras mounted with overlapping fields of view taking consistently timed images of the nearshore zone that are merged and orthorectified in post-processing. The digital post-processing of the ShoreZone imagery using Structure From Motion allows for quantitative measurements of shoreline unit dimensions, percent cover of substrate, percent cover of macro epiflora and epifauna, and time series assessments of shoreline change. In areas where a temporal sequence of imagery exists, such as in Cook Inlet, Alaska, and the north coast of British Columbia, the time series are analyzed to quantify shoreline erosion or accretion, vulnerability to flooding in the context of sea level rise, and changing wave dynamics. Since 2016, commercial software is used to digitally process the aerial images to create orthophoto mosaics and shoreline elevation models. The ShoreZone imaging and mapping protocols were revised in 2016 to utilize these new technologies. The Alaska portion of the ShoreZone database is now part of the Alaska Ocean Observing System and the Integrated Ocean Observing System.

Partnership
The ShoreZone mapping program is maintained by a unique consortium with no binding agreement. The consortium currently consists of over 50 local, regional, and national partners including First Nations, various commercial industries, non-profits, state, provincial, and federal governments. This partnership won the 2009 Coastal America Spirit Award that recognizes "exceptional projects that demonstrate the 'spirit' of teamwork for group efforts that are poised to address our challenging coastal issues.”  In the United States, the Oregon ShoreZone program is supported by the Oregon Department of Fish and Wildlife and the Oregon Coastal Management Program. The Washington ShoreZone program is supported by the Washington Department of Natural Resources. The Alaska ShoreZone program has on-going support from the National Marine Fisheries Service (NMFS) of the National Oceanic and Atmospheric Administration (NOAA) that also manages and distributes the imagery and data. In Canada, the British Columbia ShoreZone data is distributed by GeoBC. The Nature Conservancy coordinated the program until 2016.

Utility
Coastal resource managers need an inventory of habitats and associated biota that are threatened by increasing development and encroachment along coastal areas, as well as indirect effects of human activities. Coastal mapping efforts, such as ShoreZone, to a large extent fulfill these needs by providing physical and biological characterizations of the shoreline. The ShoreZone imagery and maps were originally intended as an oil spill response tool, and notably the data have been used in several emergency situations including the grounding in 2012 of the drilling barge Kulluk near Kodiak, Alaska.  Although the majority of users access only the imagery, the regional scale habitat attribute data have been used for ecological modelling and marine conservation planning. More recently the data are benefiting NOAA climate resilience studies. Recent improvements in quantifying habitat attributes allow for analytical studies such as estimating potential Blue Carbon resources of  salt marshes. The imagery also has aesthetic appeal and is used for educational content, art exhibits, exploring, books, and story maps.

Assessments
Over 450 ground stations were established to inform the mapping process and to evaluate the accuracy of the interpreted aerial imagery. The utility of ShoreZone maps for change detection was assessed by independent reviewers in 2009 and 2011, and findings include: 1) the NOAA Coast63 digital shoreline used by ShoreZone in Alaska poorly resolves features less than 50 meters, i.e., many small scale features are not represented and thus cannot be accurately described; 2) ShoreZone has no explicit minimum or maximum mapping unit resulting in inconsistent placement of unit breaks among mappers; 3) the combination of 1 & 2 contributes to the lack of repeatable unit breaks leading to potential false positive and false negative indications of change at the scale of individual shore units; and 4) users must be cognizant of the limitations imposed by qualitative mapping protocols used prior to the 2016 revisions.

References

External links
 ShoreZone
 CoastView
Alaska ShoreZone
Washington ShoreZone
Oregon ShoreZone

Coastal geography